Purba Gabberia is a village within the jurisdiction of the Jaynagar police station in the Jaynagar I CD block in the Baruipur subdivision of the South 24 Parganas district in the Indian state of West Bengal.

Geography

Demographics
As per 2011 Census of India, Purba Gabberia had a total population of 12,283.

Transport
Gocharan-Dhosa Road links Purba Gabberia to the State Highway 1.

Gocharan railway station is located nearby.

Healthcare
There is a primary health centre, with 6 beds, at Purba Gabberia.

References

Villages in South 24 Parganas district
Neighbourhoods in Jaynagar Majilpur